The following table indicates the party of elected officials in the U.S. state of Texas:
Governor
Lieutenant Governor
Attorney General
State Comptroller of Public Accounts
State Land Commissioner
State Agriculture Commissioner
Treasurer (before 1996)

The table also indicates the historical party composition in the:
State Senate
State House of Representatives
State Railroad Commission
State delegation to the U.S. Senate
State delegation to the U.S. House of Representatives

For years in which a presidential election was held, the table indicates which party's nominees received the state's electoral votes.

1846–1890

1891–1998

1999–present

References

Government of Texas
Texas